John Willamowski is a former Republican member of the Ohio House of Representatives.

External links
https://web.archive.org/web/20100203140347/http://www.house.state.oh.us/index.php?option=com_displaymembers&task=detail&district=4

Living people
Republican Party members of the Ohio House of Representatives
Year of birth missing (living people)
21st-century American politicians